Food Corporation of India Football Club is an Indian institutional football club based in Kolkata, West Bengal. The club plays in the Calcutta Premier Division.

History
The club represents the sports section of the Food Corporation of India and is controlled through the FCI Sports Promotion Board. The Board was constituted in 1969 and several committees control the departments at zonal & regional levels. It is affiliated to the Indian Football Association and participates in the divisions of the Calcutta Football League.

Notable players
 Krishanu Dey
 Aloke Mukherjee
 Mehtab Hossain
 Deepak Mondal
 Narender Thapa

Honours
Trades Cup
Champions (1): 2014
Runners-up (1): 2011

Other department

Men's hockey
FCI (eastern zone) has its men's hockey team, which is affiliated with the Bengal Hockey Association, and competes in the Calcutta Hockey League.

References

Sports clubs in India
Football clubs in Kolkata
Association football clubs established in 1969
1969 establishments in West Bengal
Works association football clubs in India